Menta is a sweet mint liqueur prepared from natural ingredients like spearmint oil. It is a refreshing drink popular in Bulgaria in the summertime. It is a component of some cocktails as the traditional "Cloud" (in Bulgarian - Облак) where it is combined with Mastika. It is a sweet mint liqueur (typical 15-25% ABV) derived from a distillate of mint leaves & is available to buy as bottles of either green or white (clear) liquids.

See also
 Bulgarian cuisine

Bulgarian distilled drinks
Herbal liqueurs